Allerion may refer to:

Charge (heraldry)
Ultimate Corp; see Pick Operating System#Derivative and related products